Duane Jones is an actor.

Duane Jones may also refer to:

Duane Jones (The Walking Dead)
Duane Jones (snooker player) (born 1993)
 Barron Winchester or Duane Jones, actor and makeup artist

See also
Dwayne Jones (disambiguation)